This is the Economic history of the Indian subcontinent. It includes the economic timeline of the region, from the ancient era to the present, and briefly summarizes the data presented in the Economic history of India and List of regions by past GDP (PPP) articles.

Antiquity 

500 BC
 Silver punch-marked coins were minted as currency belonging to a period of intensive trade activity and urban development by the Mahajanapadas.
 1 AD
Indian subcontinent under the Gupta Empire united much of the subcontinent, contained 33.21% of the world’s population, and generated an estimated average of $450 (1990 dollars) PPP per annum.

Middle Ages 

1000 
Indian subcontinent contained an estimated 28.05% of the world's population, and who individually generated an estimated average of $450 (1990 dollars) PPP per annum, and collectively produced $33,750 million.
1500
Indian subcontinent under the Delhi Sultanate contained an estimated 25.09% of the world’s population, and who individually generated an estimated average of $550 (1990 dollars) PPP per annum, and collectively produced $60,500 million, of the world's $248,321 million (24.36%), second only to Ming China in regional share.

Mughal era 

1500–1600
Indian subcontinent, mostly under the Mughal Empire after the conquest of the Delhi Sultanate and Bengal Sultanate, became economically 10 times more powerful than the contemporary Kingdom of France, contained an estimated 24.27% of the world’s population, and who individually generated an estimated average of $550 (1990 dollars) PPP per annum, and collectively produced $4,250 million, of the world's $31,344 million (4.41%), 
1600–1700
The Indian subcontinent, under Mughal Emperor's Aurangzeb policies based on Islamic economics, becomes the world's largest economy, and the most important center of manufacturing in international trade, ahead of Qing China. Worth 25% of the world's industrial output, it signalled the Proto-industrialization.
1700–1800 
Large parts of the Indian subcontinent, including Bengal Subah, which accounted for 36% of Dutch imports, and Kingdom of Mysore, both having some of the world's highest real wages and living standards, made direct essential contributions to the first Industrial revolution in Britain.

Colonial period

East India Company 
1793
 Cornwallis' Permanent Settlement Instituted in Bengal
1820
China was the world's largest economy followed by the UK and India. Industrial revolution in the UK catapulted the nation to the top league of Europe for the first time ever. During this period, British foreign and economic policies began treating India as an unequal partner for the first time.

1850
The gross domestic product of India in 1850 dropped to 5-10% and was estimated at about 40 per cent that of China. British cotton exports reach 30 per cent of the Indian market by 1850.

British Raj 
1868
 First estimation of India's national income by Dadabhai Naoroji
1870
 India's economy had a 9.2% share of world income under the British Empire.
1900
 Under the British Empire, India's share of manufacturing declined to 2% of global industrial output.
1913
 India's economy had a 5.4% share of world income under the British Empire.
1930
Indian subcontinent contained an estimated 336.4 of the world's 2,070 million people (16.25%), and who individually generated an estimated average of $726 (1990 dollars) per annum, and collectively produced $244,097 million, of the world's $3,800,000 million (6.42%)
1943
 Famine of Bengal

Post-Independence period

Just after Independence 
1952
 India's economy had a 3.8% share of world income.
1973
 India's economy was $494.8 billion, which accounted for a 3.1% share of world income.

1980–1991 
Economically closed.

1991–present 
1991
 Economic liberalisation was initiated by Indian prime minister P. V. Narasimha Rao and his finance minister Manmohan Singh in response to a macroeconomic crisis.
 1996
 Beginning of short-lived coalition govts. India's economy is $1.560 trillion (purchasing power parity) accounting for a 3.9% share of world GDP, the fifth largest in the world.
2004
 First NDA govt ends, inflation is 3.8%. India's economy is $2.870 trillion (purchasing power parity) accounting for a 4.7% share of world GDP, the fourth largest. 
 2010
 India's economy is $4.002 trillion (purchasing power parity) which accounts for a 4.5% share of world income, the fourth largest in the world in terms of real GDP (PPP).
2012
 Second half of UPA-2 and Inflation 10%. India's economy is $4.825 trillion (purchasing power parity), the third largest in the world in terms of real GDP (PPP).
2014
 India's economy is $7.376 trillion (purchasing power parity), the third largest in the world in terms of real GDP (PPP).
 2017
 NDA-2 and inflation is 3.8%. India's economy is $9.448 trillion (purchasing power parity) and accounts for a 6.8% share of world GDP (PPP).
 2021
 As of 2021, India's economy is $10.207 trillion (purchasing power parity) and accounts for a 7.19% share of world GDP (PPP).

See also 
 List of regions by past GDP (PPP)

References

Further reading 
 Maddison, Angus (2004). The World Economy: Historical Statistics. OECD. . (See Sample Table.)
 
 World Bank, 1 July 2006. PPP GDP 2005.

External links
 Relation Between Inflow Of FDI and The Development Of India's Economy, IJTEMT

Economic history of India
Economic history of Pakistan
Economic
Economic
Economic